Richard Horn may refer to:

Richard L. Van Horn, president of the University of Houston and president of the University of Oklahoma
Dick Horn, American football player
Richard Horn (DEA), brought lawsuit against CIA

See also
Richard Horne (disambiguation)